{{DISPLAYTITLE:C14H23NO2S}}
The molecular formula C14H23NO2S (molar mass: 269.40 g/mol) may refer to:

 2C-T-19, or 2,5-dimethoxy-4-butylthiophenethylamine
 4C-T-2
 Thiobuscaline
 Thiotrisescaline

Molecular formulas